Persatuan Sepakbola Ibu (simply known as Persibu) is an Indonesian football club based in West Halmahera Regency, North Maluku. They currently compete in the Liga 3.

Honours
 Liga 3 North Maluku
 Runner-up: 2019

References

Football clubs in Indonesia
Football clubs in North Maluku
Association football clubs established in 1982
1982 establishments in Indonesia